Bargh Shiraz Football Club is an Iranian football club based in Shiraz, Iran.موسسه فرهنگى ورزشى برق شيراز The club is currently in the Iran Football's 3rd Division after they were relegated from Iran Football's 2nd Division due to financial problems.
Its main sponsor is the municipal electrical company.

History

Establishment
In 1946, a group of youngsters under the leadership of Ebrahim Nematollahi, who worked in the Cheragh Bargh (lightbulb) factory and loved football, decided to create a football club. The factory sponsored their team, but for the first few years the team always had financial problems. For a brief period the club was sponsored by the city council, but after a couple of years the team's current sponsor, Shiraz Electrical Company, came along.

Bargh Shiraz club is documented as the oldest Iranian football club that is still on the list of FIFA "active clubs" and one of the oldest football clubs in Asia. Esteghlal Tehran club was founded a few months earlier, but its football club was founded four years later than Bargh Shiraz football club.

Fairplay ambassador
Little if any record of corruption, collusion and darkness is available from 7 decades of activity of this football club, in Iranian leagues that face hundreds of collusion attempts each year; making this club representative of "fairplay" in Iran. In contrast, the club has been victimized by others in Iranian football; some examples over the last 15 years are listed below:

In 2001, Bargh Shiraz team was relegated from the first division to the second division. But for the first time in Iranian football history, the team was kept in the first division by the Iranian Football Federation because 22 points were unfairly taken from the team as a result of what was called "non-fair judgements". The number of teams in the first division was only 12 at that time.

Bargh Shiraz vs. Sepahan Isfahan 2004: In the mentioned match held in Isfahan, five clear offsides occurred in a period of half an hour with judges closing eyes to them. Finally one of them was charged against Sepahan F.C. Details of the misjudgement are available on the TV show 90. (Persian:برنامه نود).

In 2010 Bargh Shiraz could not achieve promotion to the Iran Pro League (Persian Gulf league) because they scored fewer goals than Damash Gilan. Their matches in the last week were required to start simultaneously, but Damash's match started with a delay of 15 minutes. Being aware of Bargh's victory in Arak, Damash managed to score in the last minute of its match and were promoted to the Iran Pro League. In the same year, 22 players of Damash were condemned for doping, but it did not lead to any penalty for the club.

Success
Bargh's success is limited; however, in its own right they emerged as Shiraz's top team, participating in the Takht Jamshid Cup, as well as the Azadegan League and the IPL. The club has struggled at times, and over the years has had spells in the lower divisions. The club's highest honor is winning the Hazfi Cup in 1997. They have always been in the mid-table or avoiding relegation in recent years. The 2007–08 season was their best season, as they challenged strong teams with Mahmoud Yavari as manager and finished 7th in the league. But they were relegated in the 2008–09 season when they changed coaches three times.

Dark years
In the 2011–12 Azadegan League season, Bargh experienced a poor season while the organization had a huge conflict over who should take authority over the club (normally, Iranian Ministry of Power and Electricity-Fars). In this year, the club's legal owner organization declined to continue sponsoring the club. Consequently, two volunteer businessmen called Shekari and Abehesht took responsibility for the football team and brought about the darkest year in the club's history ever. The football team was relegated to the second division. In 2012, the new owner of the club (Hosein Farsi) exchanged the legitimacy of the club with another club (Steel Azin F.C.) in the Azadegan League so the club could again participate in this division.
In the same year, the futsal team of the club (Bargh Shiraz FSC) was promoted to the first division, winning the second division's cup with an impressive performance during the season.

rivalries

Shiraz Derby
The Shiraz derby is a football derby match between the two biggest clubs of Shiraz: Bargh Shiraz and Fajr Sepasi.

Players

First-team squad

Personnel

Club managers

Current technical staff

Season-by-season
The table below chronicles the achievements of Bargh Shiraz in various competitions:

 As "Bargh 3 Faz Shiraz" in replacement of old defunct team.

Honors

Domestic titles
Hazfi Cup:
Winners (1): 1997
Runners-up (1): 1996
Iran 2nd Division:
Winners (2): 1997, 2000

International titles

Aga Khan Gold Cup
Winners (1): 1970

Club chairmen

Club managers

Notes

References

 https://web.archive.org/web/20171104202110/http://barghshirazfc.com/

External links

Official
 https://www.instagram.com/barghshirazfc/
 https://telegram.me/barghshirazfc
  Official club website
  Players and results

Bargh Shiraz F.C.
Football clubs in Iran
Association football clubs established in 1946
Sport in Shiraz
1946 establishments in Iran